Mona Lee Washbourne (27 November 1903 – 15 November 1988) was an English actress of stage, film, and television. Her most critically acclaimed role was in the film Stevie (1978), late in her career, for which she was nominated for a Golden Globe Award and a BAFTA Award.

Early life
Mona Washbourne was born in Sparkhill, Birmingham, and began her entertaining career training as a concert pianist. Her sister Kathleen Washbourne was a violinist with the BBC Symphony Orchestra under Sir Adrian Boult.

Career
Washbourne was performing professionally from the early 1920s. She married the actor Basil Dignam. Her brother-in-law Mark Dignam was also a stage and film actor. In 1948, after numerous stage musical performances, Washbourne began appearing in films. Her film credits include the horror movie The Brides of Dracula, Billy Liar (1963) and The Collector (1965). She is probably best known to American audiences for her role as housekeeper Mrs. Pearce in My Fair Lady (1964). She also appeared as the stern and caustic Mrs. Bramson in the remake of Night Must Fall (also 1964), and the Matron in the film, If.... (1968).

She appeared at both the Royal Court Theatre in London and on Broadway in 1970 in David Storey's Home. She was nominated for the Tony Award for Best Performance by a Featured Actress in a Play. In 1975 she appeared on the West End stage with James Stewart in a revival of Mary Chase's play Harvey, in the role originally taken by Josephine Hull. Washbourne won the 1981 New York Film Critics' Circle Awards for Best Supporting Actress in Stevie (1978).

Later life
In 1981, Washbourne appeared in Granada Television's TV miniseries adaptation of Evelyn Waugh's novel Brideshead Revisited as Nanny Hawkins. One of her last television appearances was in Where's the Key? (1983), a BBC play about Alzheimer's disease. She died in 1988, aged 84, in London.

Selected filmography

 Evergreen (1934) – Barmaid (uncredited)
 The Winslow Boy (1948) – Miss Barnes
 Once Upon a Dream (1949) – Vicar's Wife
 The Huggetts Abroad (1949) – Lugubrious Housewife (uncredited)
 Adam and Evelyne (1949) – Mrs. Salop – Lady Gambler (uncredited)
 Maytime in Mayfair (1949) – Lady Leveson
 Double Confession (1950) – Fussy Mother
 Dark Interval (1950) (unspecified role)
 The Gambler and the Lady (1952) – Miss Minter
 Johnny on the Run (1953) – Mrs. MacGregor
 Adventure in the Hopfields (1954) – Mrs. McBain
 The Million Pound Note (1954) – Mum with Pram (uncredited)
 Star of My Night (1954) – Bit Part (uncredited)
 Doctor in the House (1954) – Midwifery Sister (uncredited)
 Betrayed (1954) – Waitress (uncredited)
 Child's Play (1954) – Miss Emily Goslett
 To Dorothy a Son (1954) – Mid Wife Appleby.
 John and Julie (1955) – Miss Rendlesham
 Cast a Dark Shadow (1955) – Monica Bare
 Alias John Preston (1955) – (uncredited)
 The Vise (1955) – Supporting Role (episode "Count of Twelve")
 Lost (1956) – Library Manageress (uncredited)
 Yield to the Night (1956) – Mrs. Thomas, landlady
 Loser Takes All (1956) – Nurse (uncredited)
 Circus Friends (1956) – Miss Linstead
 It's Great to Be Young (1956) – Miss Morrow, School Mistress
 The Good Companions (1957) – Mrs. Joe Brundit
 Stranger in Town (1957) – Agnes Smith
 Son of a Stranger (1957)
 Dunkirk (1958) – Worker Who Speaks to Holden (uncredited)
 A Cry from the Streets (1958) – Mrs. Daniels
 Count Your Blessings (1959) – Nanny
 The Brides of Dracula (1960) – Frau Lang
 No Love for Johnnie (1961) – Well-wisher at Railway Station (uncredited)
 Billy Liar (1963) – Alice Fisher
 Night Must Fall (1964) – Mrs. Bramson
 My Fair Lady (1964) – Mrs. Pearce
 Ferry Cross the Mersey (1965) – Aunt Lil
 One Way Pendulum (1965) – Aunt Mildred
 The Collector (1965) – Aunt Annie
 The Third Day (1965) – Catherine Parsons
 Casino Royale (1967) – Tea Lady (uncredited)
 Two a Penny (1968) – Mrs. Duckett
 Mrs. Brown, You've Got a Lovely Daughter (1968) – Mrs. Brown
 If.... (1968) – Matron: Staff
 The Bed Sitting Room (1969) – Mother
 The Games (1970) – Mrs. Hayes
 Fragment of Fear (1970) – Mrs. Gray
 What Became of Jack and Jill? (1972) – Gran Alice Tallent
 O Lucky Man! (1973) – Neighbour / Usher / Sister Hallett
 Identikit (1974) – Mrs. Helen Fiedke
 The Old Curiosity Shop (1975) – Mrs. Jarley
 The Blue Bird (1976) – Grandmother
 Stevie (1978) – Aunt
 The London Connection (1979) – Aunt Lydia
 Brideshead Revisited (1981) – Nanny Hawkins
 Charles & Diana: A Royal Love Story (1982) – Queen Elizabeth The Queen Mother

Awards and nominations

References

External links

 Performances listed in the Theatre Archive University of Bristol
 

1903 births
1988 deaths
English film actresses
English classical pianists
English women pianists
English stage actresses
English television actresses
Actresses from London
People from Birmingham, West Midlands
20th-century English actresses
20th-century classical pianists
20th-century English musicians
20th-century English women musicians
20th-century women pianists